This is a list of Michigan Wolverines football players in the NFL Draft.

Key

Selections

Notable undrafted players
Note: No drafts held before 1936

References

Michigan

Michigan Wolverines NFL draft